Kowala may refer to the following places:
Kowala, Lesser Poland Voivodeship (south Poland)
Kowala, Lublin Voivodeship (east Poland)
Kowala, Kielce County in Świętokrzyskie Voivodeship (south-central Poland)
Kowala, Pińczów County in Świętokrzyskie Voivodeship (south-central Poland)
Kowala, Masovian Voivodeship (east-central Poland)